Dirca palustris, or eastern leatherwood, is a shrub that grows to a maximum height of about three meters. It is native to the eastern half of North America but abundant only locally. It is most likely to be encountered in the northern part of its range, and is a dominant shrub in some hardwood forests of the upper Great Lakes Region. Rich woods, swampy in some cases, provide its main habitat, and it is occasionally cultivated. The species name, "palustris", means "of the swamps," although it also occurs in well-drained areas provided that the soils are moisture-retentive. It is often hard to recognize because the flowers, which come out just before leafing, last a very short time and D. palustris may be mixed in with the much more frequent Spicebush, which also has small yellow flowers that appear before the leaves and do so at just about the same time in the early spring. Its closest relative, the western leatherwood, lives across the continent in the San Francisco Bay Area.

References

/https://dr.lib.iastate.edu/server/api/core/bitstreams/d881d9de-ebb5-4f3f-97be-666d9f187765/content Bryan James Peterson (2013). Phytogeography of eastern leatherwood (Dirca palustris L.) resolved by chloroplast sequencing and micro satellite genotyping

External links

Thymelaeoideae
Flora of the Eastern United States
Flora of Canada
Plants described in 1753
Taxa named by Carl Linnaeus